Seán Nolan was an Irish Sinn Féin politician. He was elected unopposed as a Sinn Féin Teachta Dála (TD) to the 2nd Dáil at the 1921 elections for the Cork Mid, North, South, South East and West constituency. He opposed the Anglo-Irish Treaty and voted against it. He stood as an anti-Treaty Sinn Féin candidate at the 1922 general election but was not elected.

References

Year of birth missing
Year of death missing
Early Sinn Féin TDs
Members of the 2nd Dáil
Politicians from County Cork